Daniela Escobar Duncan (born 16 January 1969) is a Brazilian actress, television presenter and voice actress.

Biography 

Escobar was born in São Borja, in the state of Rio Grande do Sul, Brazil At the age of ten, she moved with her family to Porto Alegre, Brazil.  Her father Joao Carlos Escobar is a corporate lawyer and author, and her mother Lucia Iara Tatsch, an English teacher. Escobar's ancestry includes German, Austrian, and Portuguese.

Career 
Escobar began her acting career in Rio de Janeiro at the age of 19 years old. In 1990 she made the transition from stage to television.

From 1994 to 2015 she was contracted to star in a myriad of prime time popular television shows for TV Globo Brasil appearing in more than 25 TV Series as well as a series of independent movies. She starred in the film Diário de um Novo Mundo. Her most memorable performance was in O Clone novel 2001, where she played a mother who suffers and struggles to regain the trust of her daughter, a drug addict. In 2005 she participated in the América soap opera.

In 2010, Escobar went back to theater, along with actor Daniel de Oliveira in the controversial drama 400 Contra 1 - Uma História do Crime Organizado, a story about the rise of criminal organization Commando Vermelho. The film is directed by Caco Souza.

In 2011, Escobar made a cameo in the final chapters of the novel Ti Ti Ti Daguilene as the mother of Stefany's character, Sophie Charlotte.

She can currently be seen on TV in the novel 18h, A Vida da Gente, where she plays Suzana, foster mother of the character Alice, played by actress Sthefany Brito.

In 2013, will novel Flor do Caribe, playing the biologist Natália. In 2017, Escobar signed with RecordTV to play Ângela in the Apocalipse.

Since 2014 Escobar serves as a juror on the International Emmy Awards committee.

Personal life 
Escobar married Brazilian Film and Television director Jayme Monjardim. They have a son, André Matarazzo, who is an actor. Monjardim and Escobar divorced in 2003. Escobar subsequently married businessman Marcelo Woellner in 2009, but divorced later in 2010.  In 2017 Escobar became a vegetarian and has since become a health coach, graduating from the "Health Coach Institute of Chicago".

Currently, Escobar lives in Los Angeles, California.

Filmography

Television

Films

References 

15 It's about my personal life, and what is in there is a product of low level gossip and must be removed immediately. 
Not true. I was never married to that person in my personal life.

External links 
 
 
 

1969 births
Living people

Brazilian film actresses
Brazilian people of Scottish descent
Brazilian people of Spanish descent
Brazilian stage actresses
Brazilian telenovela actresses
Brazilian television actresses
People from Rio Grande do Sul
Pontifical Catholic University of Rio Grande do Sul alumni
Brazilian people of German descent
Brazilian people of Austrian descent
Brazilian people of Portuguese descent